Wreningham is a village and civil parish in the English county of Norfolk.

The civil parish has an area of 6.24 square kilometres and in 2001 had a population of 493 in 199 households, the population increasing to 528 at the 2011 Census For the purposes of local government, the parish falls within the district of South Norfolk.

From 1808 to 1814 Wreningham hosted a station in the shutter telegraph chain which connected the Admiralty in London to its naval ships in the port of Great Yarmouth.

Superstitions

Wreningham, allegedly, got its name from the Witch and the Wren myth. The myth tells the story of a witch living in Wreningham who was discovered by the villagers. A knight then came to kill her and upon being attacked she transformed herself into a wren to escape safely; in response the villagers beat the bushes with sticks and caught and burnt any wrens that flew out in an attempt to kill her. She supposedly returns to the village every St Stephen's Day, and traditionally the villagers would beat the hedges and burn any wrens they caught on this day.

References

 Ordnance Survey (1999). OS Explorer Map 237 - Norwich. .
 Office for National Statistics & Norfolk County Council (2001). Census population and household counts for unparished urban areas and all parishes. Retrieved 2 December 2005.

External links
.
Information from Genuki Norfolk on Wreningham.
Wreningham village website

Villages in Norfolk
Civil parishes in Norfolk